Ọya (Yorùbá: Ọya, also known as Oyá or Oiá; Yàńsàn-án or Yansã; and Iansá or Iansã in Latin America) is an orisha of winds, lightning, and violent storms, death, and rebirth. She is similar to the Haitian lwa Maman Brigitte who is syncretized with the Catholic Saint Brigit.

In Yorùbá, the name Ọya is morphologically coined from "O ya" which means "she tore." She is known as Ọya-Ìyáńsàn-án, the "mother of nine", because of nine children she gave birth to, all stillborn, suffering from a lifetime of barrenness. She is the patron of the Niger River (known to the Yorùbá as the Odò-Ọya).

Candomblé
In Candomblé, Oya is known as Oiá, lyá Mésàn, or most commonly, Iansã, from the Yoruba Yánsán.  Iansã, as in Yoruba religion, commands winds, storms, and lightning. She is the queen of the river Niger and the mother of nine. She is a warrior and is unbeatable. Attributes of Iansã include great intensity of feelings, sensations, and charm. Another ability attributed to Iansã is control over the mysteries that surround the dead. Iansã is syncretized with Saint Barbara. In the Candomblé nação (association) of Angola Congo, Iansã is associated with the color red.

Characteristics
 Salutation: "Eeparrei!", or "Epahhey, Oia!"
 Consecrated day: Thursday
 Colors: red, purple and rainbow, burgundy
 Symbols: "Buffalo tail" eruquerê, a ritual object; or a copper sword
 Prohibitions: pumpkin, stingray, and mutton
 Food: acarajé/àkàrà

Ritual foods
Acarajé is a spherical patty made with peeled, crushed black-eyed peas, stuffed with small shrimp, okra, crushed peanuts, and other savory, piquant spices. The ball-like patty is fried in dendê oil (Red palm oil). It's a traditional Afro-Brazilian dish that is also a traditional offering to Iansã in the Candomblé tradition. A simple, unseasoned form of acarajé is used in rituals and a version served with various condiments is sold as a common street food in Bahia in the northeast of Brazil. Ipeté and bobo de inhame are also associated with Iansã.

In Yorùbá, her food is pronounced 'Àkàrà". Eggplant, mulberries, pudding, and dark chocolate are also foods for Oya.

See also
 Egungun-oya

Bibliography
 Judith Gleason, Oya, San Francisco: Harper, 1992 (Shamballah, 1987), 
 Charles Spencer King, Nature's Ancient Religion,

References

Brazilian deities
Death goddesses
Santería
Sea and river goddesses
Sky and weather goddesses
Thunder goddesses
War goddesses
Wind goddesses
Yoruba goddesses